Shear (Walther Feyzioglu) is a fictional character, a Marvel Comics superhero (but not in the Marvel Universe), member of the Strikeforce: Morituri (a series in its own mostly self-contained continuity). The character was created by Peter B. Gillis and Brent Anderson.

Publication history
Shear was created by writer Peter B. Gillis and artist Brent Anderson and debuted in Strikeforce: Morituri #13 (December 1987). Shear remained in the regular cast of the book until his death in Strikeforce: Morituri #25.

Fictional character biography
Walther Feyzioglu was born in Germany, the son of Turkish immigrants. He grew to become an aggressive young man, partially because of the racism his family faced. In 2073, he was working in a factory in İzmir, Turkey, when he applied to participate in the Morituri program, a scientific program which grants superhuman abilities to its recipients, to be used as Earth's soldiers in its ongoing war against the invading alien race known as the Horde. However, the process also had a fatal side-effect: it inevitably claimed the lives of its recipients within a year, due to an unsolvable flaw.

Eager to fight the Horde, Feyzioglu applied for the process and was qualified as one of the few genetically eligible to undertake it. Thanks to the process, he developed the ability to disrupt molecular bonds from a meter away, for both inorganic and organic matter. Subsequently, he gained the codename "Shear" and became part of the third generation of Strikeforce: Morituri.

Shear proved to be extremely aggressive and bloodthirsty in battle. To demonstrate he had no mercy for his enemies, he started wearing a costume based on that of 20th-century comic book character Punisher, drawing parallels between Punisher's lack of mercy towards enemies and his own. He also proved undisciplined and often defied his superiors, the Paedia World Government, feeling that the Morituri were exploited and used as expendable pawns. He also felt the team was used less frequently in battles than they should. Later, when one of the team members, Radian, was perceived as having gone traitorous, Shear killed him in retaliation.

Later, Yuri Pogorelich, Commander of the Morituri, decided to appoint Shear the new squad leader of Strikeforce: Morituri, a post he fiercely declined. Despite Shear's wishes to the contrary, Pogorelich forced him to his new position, although the task was later given to another team member, Brava.

Death
At some point, during a battle in which the team were protecting a TV station from the attack of the Horde, one of the Morituri, Backhand, exploded due to the Morituri effect. As a result, Shear was injured in the head. Unbeknownst to him, he began developing a brain tumor. Suffering from headaches, he also began growing increasingly paranoid and began suffering persecution mania, believing that everyone was involved in a massive conspiracy whose purpose was to annihilate him. He also believed that new team member, Scanner, was intentionally giving him these headaches, since he began having them after Scanner joined. Finally, in a psychotic fit, Shear murdered Commander Pogorelich. The team engaged him, and, during a confrontation with Scanner, Shear fell to his death from the roof where they were fighting.

References

Comics characters introduced in 1987
Marvel Comics characters with superhuman strength
Marvel Comics male superheroes
Marvel Comics mutates
Marvel Comics superheroes
Fictional German people
Strikeforce: Morituri